Master Olof is a historical drama in five acts by the Swedish playwright August Strindberg. The story is about the reformer Olaus Petri's struggle against the Roman Catholic Church in the 16th century. First written in 1872, Strindberg rewrote it many times in both prose and verse.

Ludvig Josephson (the new artistic director of Stockholm's New Theatre) agreed to stage Master Olof, eventually opting for the prose version—the five-hour-long première opened on 30 December 1881 under the direction of August Lindberg to favourable reviews. This production represented Strindberg's breakthrough in the theatre.

References

Sources
 Lane, Harry. 1998. "Strindberg, August." In The Cambridge Guide to Theatre. Ed. Martin Banham. Cambridge: Cambridge UP. 1040-1041. .
 Meyer, Michael. 1985. Strindberg: A Biography. Oxford Lives ser. Oxford: Oxford UP, 1987. .

1872 plays
1881 plays
Plays by August Strindberg
Plays set in Sweden
Plays based on actual events
Plays set in the 16th century
Gustav I of Sweden